Fial (Fabbrica Italiana Automobili Legnano), direct translation Italian Automobile Factory Legnano, was a company that manufactured industrial and marine engines in Legnano. It was a part of Ghioldi Mechanical Workshops (Officine Meccaniche Ghioldi), which was founded by automotive pioneer Guglielmo Ghioldi in 1898 in Canegrate; the company moved to Legnano in 1902. In 1906 it entered the automobile business and manufactured one car, the Legnano Type A 6/8 HP. The car had a two-cylinder 1135 cc engine. Two years later, in 1908, the company was placed in liquidation after filing for bankruptcy. In 1909 the company was taken over by Rosa & Ferrario and car production ended. The 6/8 model was the only model they ever produced. The Legnano is at display on Museo Nazionale dell'Automobile in Turin.

References
This article is based on the equivalent article from the Italian Wikipedia, consulted  13 February 2017.

Defunct motor vehicle manufacturers of Italy
Vehicle manufacturing companies established in 1906
Vehicle manufacturing companies disestablished in 1909
Italian companies established in 1906
1909 disestablishments in Italy